Paul Marquet (born 26 September 1969 in Newcastle, New South Wales) is an Australian former professional rugby league footballer who played in the 1990s and 2000s.

Early life
Born in Newcastle, New South Wales. Paul played junior rugby league for Raymond Terrace, New South Wales.

Plaring career
He played for the Newcastle Knights from the interchange bench in their 2001 NRL Grand Final victory over the Parramatta Eels.

Highlights
 First Grade Debut: 1990 - Round 1, Newcastle Knights vs North Sydney Bears at EnergyAustralia Stadium, 18 March
 Premierships: Member of the 1999 Melbourne Storm team which defeated St. George Illawarra Dragons, 20–18. Member of the 2001 Newcastle Knights team which defeated the Parramatta Eels 30–24.

References

1969 births
Living people
Australian rugby league players
Hunter Mariners players
Melbourne Storm players
Newcastle Knights players
Rugby league players from Newcastle, New South Wales
Rugby league second-rows
Warrington Wolves players